Seán Brady (1890 – 29 December 1969) was an Irish Fianna Fáil politician. He was a member of Seanad Éireann from 1957 to 1965. He was nominated by the Taoiseach to the 9th Seanad in 1954, and was elected to the 10th Seanad in 1961 by the Administrative Panel. He did not contest the 1965 election.

References

1890 births
1969 deaths
Fianna Fáil senators
Members of the 9th Seanad
Members of the 10th Seanad
Nominated members of Seanad Éireann